The following highways are numbered 934:

Costa Rica
 National Route 934

Ireland
 R934 regional road

United States